Kirill Medvedev (born 19 June 1975) is a Soviet and Russian activist, musician, and author who notably gave up the copyright to all his works in 2004.

Early life and education 

Kirill Medvedev was born in Moscow. His father was a well-known post-Soviet journalist.

Career
Medvedev published two collections of poetry in his midtwenties: Everything is Bad (or It’s No Good) and Incursion; these were dismissed by some critics as not really poetry, because unusual in Russia, they were autobiographical free verse. He translated Charles Bukowksi into Russian.

In 2003, he renounced his copyright in his "Manifesto on Copyright". Literary scholar Annette Gilbert has interpreted Medwedew’s manifesto and his turning away from the established literary world as a continuation of the resistance of Russian authors against a state-regulated publishing system and samizdat.

In 2007, Medvedev founded the Free Marxist Press, which publishes the works of Ernest Mandel, Pier Paolo Pasolini, Herbert Marcuse, Terry Eagleton, and Russian authors.

In 2012, It’s No Good: poems/essays/actions a collection of poems, essays, and actions were published in English for the first time, by n+1 / Ugly Duckling Presse. In it he described his perspective in and among the mainstream poets, the inextricable "link between politics and culture," and how refusal of copyright or recognition for his works is part of a fundamental role of art to challenge existing power systems.

Musician 
Medvedev has been performing vocals and guitar in the Arkadiy Kots Band, a riot-folk band based in Moscow which formed in 2010, and is named after Russian socialist poet Arkady Kots.

Activism 
In the early 2000s Medvedev joined a small socialist party called Vpered ("Forward").
In 2017, Medvedev announced he was running in the municipal electionsin the Meshchansky District. On 12 September 2017, he announced on the party's Facebook page that he received about 11% of the vote (379 votes) and was not elected.

Personal life
In 2015 Medvedev said, that for several years he "was a stay-at-home father; more recently I have worked as a delivery man for several companies as well as a freelance book editor".

References

External links 
 
 
 Bibliography of poetry in English translation

Writers from Moscow
Soviet male poets
Soviet poets
21st-century Russian poets
1975 births
Living people
Open content people
Maxim Gorky Literature Institute alumni